African Nationalist Movement was a political party in French West Africa, led by Pierre Diagne. It was formed after the fall of the Vichy regime.

In  1946, the Mouvement Nationaliste Africain  and the Mouvement Autonomiste Africain (founded by Amadou Bâ earlier that year) formed an alliance with the Parti Socialiste Sénégalais, under the name "Bloc Africain". In September 1947, the Bloc Démocratique Sénégalais was formed, which united three other movements.

References

Further reading
 PDF

African and Black nationalist parties in Africa
Nationalist parties in Africa
Political parties in French West Africa
Political parties with year of establishment missing
Political parties with year of disestablishment missing